RockNess 2012 was the seventh RockNess Festival to take place. It took place between 8–10 June 2012. On 5 July 2011 it was announced that the first 3000 people to complete an online survey on the 2011 event would be guaranteed to get their 2012 weekend tickets for a special £99 launch price. Due to an overwhelming response the offer was opened up to everyone and a limited amount of earlybird tickets were made available through the official website for £99 or in three installments of £33. On 3 October 2011 at 9am the earlybird ticket offer ended, ticket prices were increased to an interim price of £125. The lineup for the 2012 event was announced on 26 January 2012. Volunteering was available at RockNess through 'Festival Volunteer'.

Line-up

Notes

External links
 Official website

RockNess
2012 music festivals
June 2012 events in the United Kingdom
2012 in Scotland
2012 in British music